ITC Kristen is a casual script typeface consisting of two weights designed by George Ryan for the International Typeface Corporation (ITC). It was inspired by a handwritten menu at a Cambridge, Massachusetts restaurant, and has an asymmetric structure suggesting a child's handwriting.

A TrueType version of Kristen is shipped with Microsoft Publisher 2000.

See also
Comic Sans
Chalkboard (typeface)

References

External links
ITC page
Microsoft page

International Typeface Corporation typefaces
Casual script typefaces